Rina Chibany (born 1991) is a Lebanese beauty pageant titleholder who was crowned Miss Lebanon 2012. She represented her country in the 2012 Miss Universe competition.

Rina competed for the Miss Lebanon title against her own sister Romy and 14 other contestants and ended up sharing the top two spots with her sister, the latter becoming the first runner up. The story later became popular in the pageant circuit as it was the first of its kind.

Early life

Rina stands 178 cm tall and weighs 54 kg. Her vital statistics in inches are: 34-25-37. Her favorite activities are reading and water sports. She is a Masters student in interior architecture at USEK (Universite Saint-Esprit Kaslik) .

Facts
  Rina has a twin sister called Romy who competed with her for the title of Miss Lebanon and ended up as her runner up.
 
  She has two other siblings who are also twins

References

External links
Official Miss Lebanon website

Living people
Miss Universe 2012 contestants
1991 births
Lebanese beauty pageant winners
Lebanese female models
Lebanese Christians